Parisian Pleasures (French: La revue des revues) is a 1927 French-German silent film directed by  and starring Josephine Baker, André Luguet and Hélène Hallier. The film focuses on the Parisian nightlife of the time, showing various performances of the Jazz Age, including two by Baker, with the plot taking a backseat. The performances take place within several nightclubs in Montmartre, and feature scantily-clad exotic dancers, showgirls, and acrobats.

Plot 
Gabrille Derisau is a down-on-her-luck seamstress with a dream of becoming a dance-hall star. She enters a contest aimed at finding the new Cinderella of Parisian nightclubs and ultimately wins. As her star is on the rise she develops a romantic interest with Georges Barsac, a fellow performer. But as their careers go in different directions, tensions begin to develop in their relationship.

Notes 
Although Josephine Baker received top billing, she only appears in two dance segments; accounting for just a few minutes of screen time.

Cast
 Josephine Baker
 André Luguet as Georges Barsac 
 Hélène Hallier as Gabrielle Derisau  
 Pépa Bonafé
 Erna Carise  
 Edmond Castel 
 Jeanne de Balzac
 Mme. Dehan  
 Gretchikine 
 The Hoffman Girls as Themselves  
 John Tiller's Folies Girls as Themselves  
 Mme. Komakova  
 Londonia 
 Ludovic 
 Lila Nicolska
 Skibinne 
 Standford 
 Titos 
 Henri Varna 
 Stanislawa Welska 
 Ruth Zackey

References

Bibliography 
 Rège, Philippe. Encyclopedia of French Film Directors, Volume 1. Scarecrow Press, 2009.

External links 
 

1927 films
1920s color films
German silent feature films
French silent feature films
Films of the Weimar Republic
1920s French-language films
Films directed by Joe Francis
German black-and-white films
French black-and-white films
Silent films in color
1920s French films